The Thames gas field is a depleted natural gas reservoir and former gas production facility in the UK sector of the southern North Sea. The field is located about 80 km north east of Bacton, Norfolk; the Thames production facility was in operation from 1986 until 2014.

The fields 
The Thames field was discovered by ARCO in December 1973 by well 49/28-4. The field is principally located in Block 48/28. The gas reservoir is a Rotliegend sandstone. At the time of start-up, the field was jointly owned by ARCO British Ltd (43.34%), British Sun Oil Co Ltd (23.33%), Superior Oil (UK) Ltd (20.00%), Deminex UK Oil & Gas Ltd (10.00%), and Canadian Superior Oil (UK) Ltd (3.33%). The field was anticipated to have recoverable reserves of 16.2 billion cubic metres (bcm).

In addition to Thames, the adjacent fields produced natural gas to the Thames facility.    

note 1. Reserves are in billion cubic metres (bcm).

The Thames, Bure, Deben, Welland, Wensum and Yare fields are named after rivers in East Anglia and south east England. 

Arthur and Gawain are part of the Arthurian gas fields.

Development 
The Thames field was developed by ARCO as a central 3-platform bridge linked complex. In addition to its own gas, Thames was designed to be a central hub to receive and process well fluids from the surrounding installations. Processed gas was transmitted by pipeline from Thames to the Bacton Gas Terminal, Norfolk. The main design parameters of the Thames area installations are summarized in the table.    

In 2007 the Deben wellhead was reused for the Thurne development.

The Thames AP platform had the main process equipment which included gas compressors and liquid handling plant. The accommodation facilities for 47 crew were also located on AP. The AW platform had 5 wellheads and the reception facilities for Arthur, Orwell, Gawain, Bure, Welland and Yare fields. The AR platform had reception facilities for Bure West, Horne/Wren and Thurne fields.

In addition to the gas pipelines, there were also umbilicals between some of the installations.

As part of the Thames development new pipeline reception facilities and process plant was installed at the Phillips (latter Eni, Tullow) terminal at Bacton gas terminal. From the reception facilities gas passed to the former Amoco (later Perenco) site for treatment.

Gas production 
Gas production from Thames and the connected fields is shown in the table, data includes the peak rate and the cumulative production over the period 1986 to 2014.

The production profile, in mcm/y, of the Thames field was as shown.
The production profile, in mcm/y, of the Orwell field was as shown.

Decommissioning and recommissioning 
A cessation of production authorisation for Thames was granted in May 2014. Perenco developed a decommissioning programme. This entailed the plugging and abandonment of all wells and removal of all structures above the seabed. Pipelines were left in situ after being flushed and filled with seawater.

In 2019 Independent Oil and Gas (now IOG) purchased the Thames gas pipeline reception facilities at the Bacton terminal. The facilities comprise an area of land within the Perenco part of Bacton where IOG’s fully-owned Thames pipeline connects to the terminal. It includes gas and liquids reception equipment recommissioned for the development of IOG’s southern North Sea Core Project, across six fields. Produced gas will continue onto the main Perenco Bacton plant for final processing. In 2021 the Blythe and Southwark platforms were installed.

See also 

 Bacton gas terminal
 Arthurian gas fields
 Leman gas field
 Indefatigable gas field
 List of oil and gas fields of the North Sea

References 

Natural gas fields in the United Kingdom

North Sea energy
North Sea